Orphnaecus pellitus is a species of the family Theraphosidae.

Characteristics
O. pellitus has a dark brown cephalothorax and a red-brown abdomen. In females, the cephalothorax is 15.5 mm long, the abdomen is 22 mm, the maxillary palpus is 26.7 mm, and the legs are:

 49.5 mm 
 41.5 mm 
 38.5 mm 
 49.8 mm.

In males, the cephalothorax is 12.5 mm, the maxillary palpus is 19.6 mm, and the legs are:

 47.5 mm
 40.5 mm
 30 mm
 48 mm

References

Theraphosidae
Spiders of Asia
Spiders described in 1892